Shirpur Assembly constituency is one of the 288 Vidhan Sabha constituencies of Maharashtra state in western India. This constituency is located in the Dhule district and presently it is reserved for the candidates belonging to the Scheduled tribes.

It is part of the Nandurbar Lok Sabha constituency along with another five Vidhan Sabha segments, namely Sakri in the Dhule district and Akkalkuwa, Navapur, Nandurbar and Shahada in the Nandurbar district.

Members of Legislative Assembly
 1962: Vyankatrao Tanaji Dhobi, Indian National Congress
 1967: Pralhadsheth Chindhusheth Sonar(Kulthe), Indian National Congress
 1967: Shivajirao Girdhar Patil, Indian National Congress
 1972: Shivajirao Girdhar Patil, Indian National Congress
 1978: Pralhadrao Madhavrao Patil, Janata Party
 1980: Rajput Indrasingh Chandrasingh, Indian National Congress (I)
 1985: Patil Sambhaji Hiraman, Janata Party
 1990: Amrish Patel, Indian National Congress
 1995: Amrish Patel, Indian National Congress
 1999: Amrish Patel, Indian National Congress
 2004: Amrish Patel, Indian National Congress
 2009: Kashiram Vechan Pawara, Indian National Congress
 2014: Kashiram Vechan Pawara, Indian National Congress
 2019: Kashiram Vechan Pawara, Bharatiya Janata Party

Election results

Assembly Elections 2009

Assembly Elections 2014

See also
 Shirpur
 Prakash Bhoma Gujar
 List of constituencies of Maharashtra Vidhan Sabha
 Dr Jitendra Thakur
https://commons.wikimedia.org/wiki/File:Dr_Jitendra_Thakur.jpg
 Dr jitendra Thakur and VijayKumar Gavit
https://commons.wikimedia.org/wiki/File:Dr_jitendra_thakur_dr_vijay_kumar_gavit.jpg
 Dr Jitendra Thakur and Ekanath Khadse
https://commons.wikimedia.org/wiki/File:Dr_Jitendra_thakur.jpg
 Dr Jitendra Thakur and Raosaheb danve Patil 
https://commons.wikimedia.org/wiki/File:Dr_jitendra_Thakur.jpg
 Dr jitendra Thakur Photo in boradi
     https://commons.wikimedia.org/wiki/File:Dr_jitendra_thakur_boradi.jpg
 Dr Jitendra Thakur Facebook Link
    https://www.facebook.com/Dr.jitendraThakur77/

References

Assembly constituencies of Maharashtra
Dhule district